An amphibious excavator (or pontoon excavator or floating excavator) is a type of excavator that can perform dredging while afloat on soft terrain such as swamp, wet land, and shallow water. An amphibious excavator is better adapted for removing silty clay, clearing silted trenches, swampland operation, and shallow water operation than traditional barge-mounted dredgers.

Walking and working 
The amphibious excavator can walk or work in water, because the chassis crawler floats on sealed pontoons. It may swing or even roll over when excavating with no support underneath. 
It moves using a dual-body boat form buoyancy tank. A reducer drives the crawler chain, allowing free and smooth movement. Its upper structure is a modified excavator that allows 360° full rotation and hydraulic operation.

Sealed pontoon 
The pontoons are manufactured from high tension steel and they are atmospheric corrosion- and saltwater-resistant. Each pontoon has 5 independent water tight compartments with maintenance holes. The bottoms of the pontoons are reinforced for rough terrain operation. The power for the pontoon tracks is provided by an excavator engine and main hydraulic pumps with traveling motors.

Accessories 

Side pontoon—increase flotation
Piling vibrator
Excavation bucket
Clamshell
Demolition sorting grab
Dredging pump

See also 
 Crawler excavator

References

External links

Excavators
Amphibious vehicles